Long Live with Dearly Departed is a 1935 Czech comedy film directed by Martin Frič.

Cast 
 Hugo Haas as Petr Suk
 Adina Mandlová as Alice Machová
 Karel Hašler as Petr Kornel (as K. Hasler)
 Milada Gampeová as Barbora - Housekeeper
 Václav Trégl as Baltazar
 František Kreuzmann as Dr. Liska
 Ferdinand Hart as Remington
 Božena Svobodová as Remingtonová
 Jaroslav Marvan as Duriex
 Čeněk Šlégl
 Stanislav Neumann as Filip
 Antonín Vaverka as Pal
 Frantisek Cerný as Creditor
 Emilie Nitschová as Nurse

References

External links 
 

1935 films
1935 comedy films
1930s Czech-language films
Czechoslovak black-and-white films
Films directed by Martin Frič
Czech comedy films
1930s Czech films